Hydrogen was a champion Australian thoroughbred racehorse.

By the imported stallion Delville Wood (who also sired Melbourne Cup winner Evening Peal) he was foaled in 1948 and was trained throughout his career by Ted Hush.

Hydrogen failed by a neck of being the first horse to win three Cox Plates when beaten in 1951 as a three-year-old. He won the subsequent two editions of the race in 1952 and 1953.

An outstanding three-year-old he developed into one of Australia’s finest weight-for-age performers and the highest stakes earner at the time eclipsing the record previously held by Phar Lap.

A winner over six furlongs (1,200m) to two miles (3,200m) he won many major races including the 1951 VATC Caulfield Guineas, 1951 VRC Victoria Derby, 1951 STC Rosehill Guineas, 1951 AJC Craven Plate, the 1952 and 1953 MVRC W.S. Cox Plate,  1953 VRC LKS Mackinnon Stakes and the 1953 QTC Brisbane Cup.

He was retired to stud in 1954.

Owner E.R Williams was a founding part owner of the Woolworths retail chain in Sydney 1924 and was known in racing as the man with the 'Midas Touch' also owned Pride of Egypt , Lord Forrest and Forest Beau. 
E.R.Williams died in March 1961

Trainer Ted Hush originally was a strapper for Newcastle trainer Alf Inkpen also rode as a jockey in the western districts of New South Wales. Major race winners in Abspear 1943 Sydney Cup and Dewar 1943 Tramway Handicap bringing Hush into prominence at Randwick with other major winners being  Russia 1946 Melbourne Cup, Pride of Egypt 1954 Victoria Derby and Caranna 1955 AJC Derby.
Ted Hush died in February 1957.

Hydrogen's racing record: 60 starts for 26 wins, 8 seconds, 9 thirds and 17 unplaced runs.

Image gallery

References

Cox Plate winners
Victoria Derby winners
1948 racehorse births
Thoroughbred family 2-g
Racehorses bred in Australia
Racehorses trained in Australia